Parijatham is a 2006 Indian Tamil language romantic drama film directed by Bhagyaraj. The film stars Prithviraj and Saranya Bhagyaraj. It was released to positive reviews.

Plot
Santhosh and Seetha have a son named Surendhar. Sumathi lived in a palatial house and enjoyed a luxurious life in her childhood. However, her father loses his textile business and sinks into poverty.

Seetha moves to the house opposite Sumathi's house. Her husband and son are still back in their city, waiting to finish training. Sumathi approaches her to work as a maid. Seetha becomes impressed at first sight by Sumathi's wise and sensible character and takes her as her maid. After a few days, Seetha learns that the house she has moved into was initially owned by Sumathi's family. She gets influenced by Sumathi's modesty, kindness, and good nature. Sumathi also had the habit of writing novels, one of which she shared with Seetha. Seetha imagined her son and Sumathi as the characters in the story (the characters are named Sridhar and Subhathra), which gave her the opportunity to react differently. Assuming her son and Sumathi are fictional characters in the story, she expresses her desire to make Sumathi her daughter-in-law. At first Sumathi is shocked, but she accepts her request happily.

Seetha communicates this arrangement over the phone to her husband and son that she has chosen her daughter-in-law. However, she did not reveal the name or identity of Sumathi, because she wants it to be a surprise when they meet her in person. Unfortunately, Seetha dies in an accident before her husband and son's arrival, which leaves a suspense as to who the daughter-in-law is.

After his mother's death, Surendhar vows to locate and marry a girl identified by her mother. Since Sumathi is a maid in the house and is much poorer compared to Seetha's family, she does not reveal she is the one. Sampooranam, Surendhar's close friend, moves into their house to snoop around and find out the girl identified by Seetha. As a father, Santhosh didn't have patience and wanted his son to have a good life. This led him to choose a rich girl, completely opposite of what Seetha would have chosen.

Passed many twists and turns, Sampooranam succeeds in identifying that Sumathi was the girl Seetha chose. His main evidence was Sumathi's published novel, the one she shared to Seetha. Surendhar happily marries Sumathi with Santhosh and Sampooranam's blessings. The story ends with Sumathi remembering the words of Seetha, that she has always imagined Sumathi to be the wife of her son.

Cast

Production
Prashanth was initially expected to be play the role when the film was announced in August 2004, before he opted out and was replaced by Prithviraj.

Soundtrack
The soundtrack consists of five songs composed by Dharan. Dharan used to participate in music programs in the college that director K. Bhagyaraj's daughter Saranya studied in. For the film, Saranya recommended Dharan as the film composer. The album became a chartbuster, with the song "Unnai Kandaene" being listed among the top ten songs of the year. Sify in its review described Dharan's songs and background score as "a major highlight" of the film, which became a commercial successful as well.

"Ennil Ennil Nee" - Haricharan, Mahathi
"Oru Nodi Iru Nodi" - Karthik, Srilekha Parthasarathy, Shweta Mohan
"Theme Music" - Dharan
"Unnai Kandane" - Haricharan, Shruthi
"Yedho Nadakuthu" - Krithika, Ranjith

Box office
The film was a commercial success.

References

External links

 Parijatham Songs Download and Listen
 Thenisai review

2006 films
Films scored by Dharan Kumar
2006 romantic comedy films
2000s Tamil-language films
Films directed by K. Bhagyaraj
Indian romantic comedy films